Faded Melody is a 1938 German drama film directed by Viktor Tourjansky and starring Brigitte Horney, Willy Birgel and Carl Raddatz. The film was made by Germany's largest studio of the era UFA. It was shot at the Babelsberg Studios in Potsdam and on location in French Algeria, New York City and Berlin. The film's sets were designed by the art directors Hermann Asmus and Max Mellin. It premiered at Berlin's Gloria-Palast.

Synopsis
Horney and Birgel play characters engaged in a troubled transatlantic romance, with she based in New York City and he in Berlin.

Partial cast
 Brigitte Horney as Barbara Lorenz
 Willy Birgel as Thomas Gront
 Carl Raddatz as Werner Gront
 Hans Brausewetter as Steffken
 Vera von Langen as Olga, Thomas' Freundin
 Silvia de Bettini as Sonja
 Erich Fiedler as Freddy
 Karl Platen as Karl, Diener
 Andrews Engelmann as Casiez
 Bill Bocket as Léon
 Achim von Biel as Schmidt, Thomas' Sekretär
 Angelo Ferrari as Der Kellner bei der Silvesterfeier
 Jens von Hagen as Das Mädchen bei Barbara
 Hilde Heinrich as Die Krankenschwester
 Carl Merznicht as Der Assistenzarzt
 Pia Mietens as Ein Gast bei Olga, die sich nach Thomas erkundigt
 Michael von Newlinsky as Ein französischer Sergeant am Flughafen
 Hans-Joachim Roedelius as Der kleine Bobby, Barbaras Söhnchen
 Stella Textor as Eine französische Flugpassagierin
 Theodor Thony as Ein französischer Flugpassagier
 Werner Finck
 Boris Alekin
 Ernst Behmer
 Josef Karma

References

Bibliography 
 Hake, Sabine. Popular Cinema of the Third Reich. University of Texas Press, 2001.

External links 
 

1938 films
Films of Nazi Germany
German drama films
German black-and-white films
1938 drama films
1930s German-language films
Films set in Berlin
Films set in New York City
Films directed by Victor Tourjansky
UFA GmbH films
1930s German films
Films shot at Babelsberg Studios
Films shot in Algeria